Progress M-14, was a Russian uncrewed Progress cargo spacecraft which was launched in 1992 to resupply the Mir space station. The spacecraft was modified to transport the first VDU propulsion unit to Mir. Progress M-14 also carried the sixth VBK-Raduga capsule, which was recovered after the flight.

Launch
Progress M-14 launched on 15 August 1992 from the Baikonur Cosmodrome in Kazakhstan. It used a Soyuz-U2 rocket.

Docking
Progress M-14 docked with Mir on 18 August 1992 at 00:20:48 GMT.

See also

1992 in spaceflight
List of Progress flights
List of uncrewed spaceflights to Mir

References

Progress (spacecraft) missions
1992 in spaceflight
Spacecraft launched in 1992
1992 in Russia